Seán Brosnahan (1911 – 9 December 1987) was an Irish independent politician. He was a trade union official and general secretary of the Irish National Teachers' Organisation. He was elected to Seanad Éireann by the Labour Panel at the 1961 Seanad election, and re-elected in 1965, 1969 and 1973. He lost his seat at the 1977 Seanad election.

References

1911 births
1987 deaths
Independent members of Seanad Éireann
Members of the 10th Seanad
Members of the 11th Seanad
Members of the 12th Seanad
Members of the 13th Seanad
Irish schoolteachers